Veitchia joannis, the Joannis palm, is a species of flowering plant in the family Arecaceae. It is native to Fiji and reportedly naturalised in Tonga.

References

External links
Article on PACSOA website

joannis
Flora of Fiji
Flora of Tonga
Least concern plants
Taxonomy articles created by Polbot